The Ender's Game series (often referred to as the Ender saga and also the Enderverse) is a series of science fiction books written by American author Orson Scott Card. The series started with the novelette Ender's Game, which was later expanded into the novel of the same title. It currently consists of sixteen novels, thirteen short stories, 47 comic issues, an audioplay, and a film. The first two novels in the series, Ender's Game and Speaker for the Dead, each won both the Hugo and Nebula Awards.

The series is set in a future where mankind is facing annihilation by an aggressive alien society, an insect-like race known formally as "Formics", but more colloquially as "Buggers". The series protagonist, Andrew "Ender" Wiggin, is one of the child soldiers trained at Battle School (and eventually Command School) to be the future leaders for the protection of Earth.

Enderverse

Ender series
Starting with Ender's Game, five novels and one novella have been released that tell the story of Ender. The first four have been described (and released as a box set) as The Ender Quartet and, together with Ender in Exile, as The Ender Quintet. Card first wrote Ender's Game as a novelette, but later expanded it into a novel.

While the first novel concerned itself with armies and space warfare, Speaker for the Dead, Xenocide, and Children of the Mind are more philosophical in nature, dealing with the difficult relationship between the humans and the "Piggies" (or "Pequeninos"), and Andrew's (Ender's) attempts to stop another xenocide from happening.

A War of Gifts: An Ender Story, a novella, was released in October 2007. It is a parallel story set during Ender's first year in Battle School.

Ender in Exile, which is both sequel of Ender's Game and a prequel to Speaker for the Dead  was released in November 2008. It involves Ender's journey to the first human colony on a former Formic world. Because of changes Card made to a few details of the story of that first colony ship and Ender's role as governor, it serves as a replacement for the last chapter of Ender's Game. It also deals with his meeting a character from the parallel Shadow saga (effectively wrapping up a remaining plotline in the parallel series).

Shadow saga
Starting with Ender's Shadow, five novels and one novella have been released that tell the story of the people Ender left behind – this has been dubbed the Shadow saga (also known as the "Shadow Quintet").

Ender's Shadow is a parallel novel to Ender's Game, telling many of the same events from the perspective of Bean, a mostly peripheral character in Ender's Game, while the first three sequels, Shadow of the Hegemon, Shadow Puppets and Shadow of the Giant tell the story of the struggle for world dominance after the Bugger War. This involves the Battle School children, as well as Ender's brother, Peter Wiggin, and Petra Arkanian going up against Achilles de Flandres (from Poke's crew).

A sequel novella to Shadow of the Giant named Shadows in Flight further introduces three of Bean's children who also have Anton's key turned.

The Last Shadow (previously called Shadows Alive), was released in November 2021, takes place after both Children of the Mind and Shadows in Flight, tying up the two series, and explaining some unanswered questions.

Formic Wars

The First Formic War
Card and Aaron Johnston wrote a trilogy to cover the events of the First Formic War. Chronologically, this series comes before all other books in the Ender's Game series. Earth Unaware was released on July 17, 2012. Earth Afire, was released on June 4, 2013, and Earth Awakens on June 10, 2014.

The Second Formic War
On November 4, 2013, Johnston confirmed work on a second trilogy of novels covering the Second Formic War, with the manuscript for the first book due in 2014. The planned titles of the novels are (in order) The Swarm, The Hive, and The Queens. The Swarm, continuing the stories of Victor Delgado, Mazer Rackham, and Bingwen, was released on August 2, 2016. The Hive was released on June 11, 2019.

Fleet School
According to an interview with Orson Scott Card at Southern Virginia University, Fleet School is "a new set of sequels to Ender's Game. It's for a young adult audience. It's what happens to Battle School after the International Fleet loses its purpose of war. It becomes what is called Fleet School, and it prepares kids to become commanders / explorers in the colonies that are going to be forming. We get to see that as the school administrators repurpose the school, the Battle Room is still there, but it's a whole different kind of education." On November 12, 2015, Orson Scott Card announced the title of the series and its first novel, Children of the Fleet was released on October 10, 2017.

Publications

Novels in the series 
To date, there are 19 publications in the Ender's Game series, five novels and one novella in the Ender series, five novels and one novella in the Shadow Saga, five novels in the Formic Wars series, one novel in the Fleet School series and one collection of short stories. According to Card, there is no strictly preferred order of reading them, except that Xenocide should be read right before Children of the Mind.
The books can be read in the order in which they were originally written or in chronological order.

Publication date

Chronological order 

Earth Unaware
Earth Afire
Earth Awakens
The Swarm
The Hive
The Queens (TBA)
Ender's Game 
Ender's Shadow (Note: The events of Ender's Game and Ender's Shadow take place in roughly the same time period.)
A War of Gifts (Note: This takes place during Ender's Game/Ender's Shadow.)
Shadow of the Hegemon
Children of the Fleet (Note: opening chapters take place during Shadow of the Hegemon.)
Shadow Puppets
Shadow of the Giant
Ender in Exile (Note: Beginning takes place during Shadow of the Hegemon and through Shadow of the Giant)
Shadows in Flight
First Meetings (Note: This is actually a collection of four short stories. The first two take place when Ender's parents are children and in their teens. The next is the original novella "Ender's Game". The last brings Ender and Jane together for the first time. "First Meetings" is listed right before "Speaker for the Dead" because the last story takes place when Ender had just turned 20.)
Speaker for the Dead
Xenocide
Children of the Mind
The Last Shadow

Short stories in the series

First Meetings
First Meetings is a collection of short stories whose settings range from before Ender's Game until after Shadows in Flight and was first released in 2002.

Comic books in the series

Comic books in the Ender Universe are currently being published by Marvel Comics.

Game
In 2008 it was announced an Ender's Game video game was in the works. It was to be known as Ender's Game: Battle Room and was a planned digitally distributed video game for all viable downloadable platforms. It was under development by Chair Entertainment, which also developed the Xbox Live Arcade games Undertow and Shadow Complex. Chair had sold the licensing of Empire to Card, which became a best-selling novel. Little was revealed about the game, save its setting in the Ender universe and that it would have focused on the Battle Room.

In December, 2010, it was announced that the video game development had stopped and the project put on indefinite hold.

Orson Scott Card and Amaze Entertainment also came to an agreement about a game adaption of the Ender's Game novel but the plans never became a reality.

Manga
In 2014, Satō Shūhō's manga, Ender's Game (Jp Ender no Game) appeared.

Audioplay

Film

The film Ender's Game was released in the UK on October 25, 2013, and in the USA on November 1, 2013. The first script was based on two installments of the Ender series, Ender's Game and Ender's Shadow, when optioned by Warner Brothers, but was adapted to focus exclusively on Ender's Game when purchased by Lionsgate. The cast includes Harrison Ford, Abigail Breslin, Ben Kingsley, and Asa Butterfield as Ender Wiggin. The film was directed by Gavin Hood.Ender's Shadow Audiobook, author's epilogue

Related

The Authorized Ender Companion
Written by Jake Black, The Authorized Ender Companion is "the indispensable guide to the universe of Ender's Game."
Sections in this book include: The Ender Encyclopedia, Ender's Timeline, Ender's Family Tree by Andrew Lindsay, Getting Ender Right: A Look at the Ender's Game Screenplay Development by Aaron Johnston, and The Technology of Ender's Game by Stephen Sywak. The majority of the book consists of encyclopedia references to the events, characters, locations, and technology found in the Ender's Game series up to the publication of Ender in Exile.

The book is notable for having new and behind the scenes information on certain topics such as Battle School Slang, The Look of the Formics, The History of Hyrum Graff, Ender and Valentine's Travels, and Mazer Rackham's Spaceship.

Ender's World: Fresh Perspectives on the SF Classic Ender's GameEnder's World contains 14 essays from Science Fiction and Young Adult writers, as well as military strategists and others about various aspects of Ender's Game. The book includes an introduction by Orson Scott Card, who edited Ender's World and answers from many fan-submitted Enderverse questions from the Smart Pop Books Website. These essays are included in the compilation:
 "How It Should Have Ended" by Eric James Stone
 "The Monster's Heart" by John Brown
 "The Cost of Breaking the Rules" by Mary Robinette Kowal
 "Winning and Losing in Ender’s Game" by Hilari Bell
 "Parallax Regained" by David Lubar, Alison S. Myers
 "Mirror, Mirror" by Alethea Kontis
 "Size Matters" by Janis Ian
 "Rethinking the Child Hero" by Aaron Johnston
 "A Teenless World" by Mette Ivie Harrison
 "Ender on Leadership" by Colonel Tom Ruby
 "Ender Wiggin, USMC" by John F. Schmitt
 "The Price of Our Inheritance" by Neal Shusterman
 "If the Formics Love Their Children Too" by Ken Scholes
 "Ender's Game: A Guide to Life" by Matt Nix

Characters 
The Formics, also known as Buggers, are a fictional ant-like alien species from the Ender's Game series of science fiction novels by Orson Scott Card.

According to the novel canon, the Formics attacked Earth 50 years before the novel begins. They attempted to colonise the planet and were barely fought off by a New Zealand soldier known as Mazer Rackham. The first book in the series, Ender's Game, largely stems from the human quest to defend themselves from this species, although the Formics ultimately turn out as victims, with the first attack being an accident due to differing biology.

The term "Formic" is derived from formica, the Latin word for ant; whereas "bugger" is a pejorative used by humans; yet it was not until 1999's Ender's Shadow that the term 'Formic' was first used, interchangeably with 'Bugger'. Later books used 'Formic' almost exclusively, as the more 'scientific' term. This leads to odd scenarios in the continuity of the books, such as Valentine referring to them as "Buggers" in Ender's Game, chronologically next as "Formics" in Ender in Exile, and again as "Buggers" in Speaker for the Dead and Xenocide. The feature film adaptation of Ender's Game uses "Formics" exclusively.

The Formic species consists of hive-minded colonies directed by queens. In Ender's Game, Graff described them as being an insect that "could have evolved on earth, if things had gone a different way a billion years ago," and that their evolutionary ancestors could have looked similar to Earth's ants. While often described as "insectoid", the Formics are warm-blooded, developed an internal skeleton and shed most of their exoskeleton, evolved a complex system of internal organs, and they respire and perspire.  If a queen dies, all the workers under her control lose their ability to function immediately; but in Xenocide, implications exist that 'workers' can escape the influence of a queen. The Formic race is revealed to be trimorphic in Shadows in Flight. Drones are much smaller and depend on a Hive Queen for survival, and their bodies are shaped to spend their lives clinging to her, until upon her death, they take flight to seek out a new queen. Drones are capable of individual thought and action as well as mind-to-mind communication, more limited than that of a queen; whereas queens communicate instantaneously and can even do so with other species. Formics live in vast underground colonies, usually without light, informing the assumption that Formics make use of sensory apparatus outside the range of the electromagnetic spectrum visible to humans. In the first novel they have artificial lighting; whereas in Xenocide, Ender claims they rely on heat signature.

See also

Ender's Game (film)
List of characters in the Ender's Game series
List of works by Orson Scott Card
Zerg - an alien race from the Starcraft universe, similar to the Formics

Notes
1.  
2.  
3.  

References

Sources
 Ender's Game by Orson Scott Card
 Ender's Shadow by Orson Scott Card
 Speaker for the Dead by Orson Scott Card
 Xenocide by Orson Scott Card
 Children of the Mind by Orson Scott Card
 First Meetings by Orson Scott Card
 Ender in Exile'' by Orson Scott Card

External links
 The official Orson Scott Card website
 The Ender Quartet, Ender's Shadow, and Ender series pages at Tor Books
 The Ender Saga
 

Book series introduced in 1985
 
Novels by Orson Scott Card
Science fiction novel series
Space opera novels